Johannes Daniel Falk (28 October 1768 Danzig – 14 February 1826 Weimar) was a German publisher and poet.

Falk was born in Danzig (Gdańsk) in the Polish province of Royal Prussia, where he received his first education against the wishes of his father, who wanted to employ the child in his business as wig maker. The Danzig city council granted Falk a theology stipendium at Halle, but he did not become a preacher and frequented literary circles of Schiller and Goethe instead.

In late 1815 or early 1816, he wrote the German text O du fröhliche that became a popular Christmas carol, to the melody of the Catholic hymn O Sanctissima.

Falk was the founder of the Falk'sche Institute, a public education place for orphans in Weimar. He died in that city in 1826.

References

External links
 
 
 Johann Daniel Falk works, MSS 1992 at L. Tom Perry Special Collections, Harold B. Lee Library, Brigham Young University

1768 births
1826 deaths
Christian poets
German poets
German male poets
German Protestant hymnwriters
German social workers
Writers from Gdańsk
19th-century philanthropists